Oreophantes is a monotypic genus of North American dwarf spiders containing the single species, Oreophantes recurvatus. It was first described by K. Y. Eskov in 1984, and has only been found in the United States and Canada.

See also
 List of Linyphiidae species (I–P)

References

Linyphiidae
Monotypic Araneomorphae genera
Spiders of North America